The 2004 Denver Broncos season was the franchise's 35th season in the National Football League (NFL) and the 45th overall. Under head coach Mike Shanahan the Broncos equalled their 10–6 record from 2003, and again finished second in the AFC West. In a repeat of 2003, the Broncos’ season ended in defeat to the Indianapolis Colts 49–24 in the AFC Wild Card playoffs.

Starting quarterback Jake Plummer finished the season with 4,089 passing yards (4th in the league). During the offseason, the Broncos traded running back Clinton Portis to the Washington Redskins in exchange for cornerback Champ Bailey.

Off Season
The Broncos acquired cornerback Champ Bailey in a trade with the Washington Redskins, sending running back Clinton Portis to Washington in return.

During the offseason, the Broncos failed to retain linebackers Keith Burns and Ian Gold. Both would sign with the Tampa Bay Buccaneers, but however, both players would return to the team in the following season. Also, the Broncos failed to retain defensive end Bertrand Berry, who would sign with the Arizona Cardinals as a free agent.

The Broncos also signed safety John Lynch as a free agent after he was released by the Tampa Bay Buccaneers.

NFL Draft

Staff

Roster

Schedule

In addition to their regular games with AFC West rivals, the Broncos played teams from the AFC South and NFC South as per the schedule rotation, and also played intraconference games against the Dolphins and the Bengals based on their common divisional position vis-à-vis the Broncos from 2003.

Playoffs

Standings

References

 Broncos on Pro Football Reference
 Broncos Schedule on jt-sw.com

Denver Broncos
Denver Broncos seasons
Denver Broncos